"Taboo" is a song by British dancehall musician Glamma Kid featuring Shola Ama. It was released on 5 April 1999 as the third single from the debut album Kidology. A top 10 hit, the song peaked at No. 10 on the UK Singles Chart, and No. 1 on the UK Dance Chart. The song also charted in the Netherlands and New Zealand, peaking at numbers 26 and 22, respectively. In France, it peaked at No. 78. The song interpolates the 1985 Sade hit, "The Sweetest Taboo".

The 'MJ Cole Full Vocal Mix', a garage remix by MJ Cole, proved popular in the UK garage scene in 1999. Mixmag included this remix in their list of "16 of the Best Uplifting Vocal Garage Tracks".

Track listing
CD single
 "Taboo" (Video Mix) - 3:28
 "Taboo" (Stargate R'n'B Mix) - 4:07
 "Taboo" (Clarkey & Blakey Mix) - 4:40
 "Taboo" (MJ Cole Full Vocal Mix) - 5:26

12" single
A1. "Taboo" (Original Mix) - 5:00
A2. "Taboo" (Stargate R'n'B Mix) - 4:07
B1. "Taboo" (MJ Cole Vocal Dub) - 6:13
B2. "Taboo" (Dave Kelly Mix) - 3:49

Year-end charts

References

1999 songs
1999 singles
Glamma Kid songs
Shola Ama songs
Songs written by Sade (singer)
Warner Music Group singles